Look at All the Love We Found is a tribute album by various artists dedicated to Sublime, released on June 21, 2005. The title comes from a lyric in the song "S.T.P." on Sublime's Robbin' the Hood album.

Track listing
 "Badfish"/"Boss D.J." - Jack Johnson
 "What I Got" - Michael Franti & Spearhead featuring Gift of Gab
 "Date Rape" - Fishbone
 "Get Out!" - Bargain Music
 "Santeria" - Avail
 "DJs" - No Doubt *Live Track
 "Paddle Out" - The Ziggens
 "Work That We Do" - Mike Watt and Petra Haden with Stephen Perkins
 "Get Ready" - Filibuster featuring Half Pint
 "Greatest Hits" - G Love
 "Doin' Time" - The Greyboy Allstars
 "Garden Grove" - Camper Van Beethoven
 "April 29, 1992 (Miami)" - Ozomatli
 "Waiting for My Ruca" - Awol One/Abstract Rude/Josh Fischel/Transducer
 "Same in the End" - Pennywise
 "Pawn Shop" - Los Lobos

2005 albums
Tribute albums
Sublime (band)